Leslie Pantoja Hernández (born 25 August 1976) is a Mexican politician affiliated with the PAN. She served as a federal deputy of the LXII Legislature of the Mexican Congress representing Sonora, and previously served as a local deputy in the LIX Legislature of the Congress of Sonora.

References

1976 births
Living people
People from Mexicali
Women members of the Chamber of Deputies (Mexico)
National Action Party (Mexico) politicians
21st-century Mexican politicians
21st-century Mexican women politicians
Politicians from Baja California
Members of the Congress of Sonora
Deputies of the LXII Legislature of Mexico
Members of the Chamber of Deputies (Mexico) for Sonora